All Lights India International Film festival (ALIIFF), is an annual film festival of India conducted in Hyderabad. It is usually conducted in December every year. The 4th edition was held from Dec 1-4, 2018 at PVR Inorbit Mall, Hyderabad. Popular Malayalam film actor and national award-winning director Balachandra Menon was the festival director of the 2018 edition.

History
The first edition of ALIIFF was held in 2015 in Kochi, Kerala. The second and third editions were held at Ramoji Film City in Hyderabad. The film festival was founded by Sohan Roy, Hollywood director of Indian origin and a media entrepreneur.

ALIIFF is part of the Indywood Film Carnival and has introduced some notable films such as Theeb which later went on to win the Oscar in Foreign Films category in 2015. Popular regional superstars such as Mohanlal, Kamal Hassan and Venkatesh have been patrons of the event in the past. The event is managed by the All Lights Film Society. Nisha Joseph is the Artistic Director of ALIIFF.

The 2017 edition saw films as part of 6 competitive and 9 non-competitive categories. Every year, the festival awards the Golden Frame Award to the best film.

Veteran Film director and winner of Dadasaheb Phalke Lifetime Achievement Award, Shyam Benegal was the festival director of the 2017 edition.

Competition Categories

 International Competition for Student Short Films
 International Competition for Short Films
 International Competition for Documentary Films
 International Competition for Indian Movies
 International Competition for Debut Director's Films (Features)
 International Competition for Feature Films
 Short Film Corner

Out of Competition Categories

 Children Films
 Environmental and Sustainability Films

Award Categories

 Film Critics Circle of India Award for the Best Indian Movie
 NETPAC Award for The Best Asian Cinema
 Best Student Short Film
 Best Short Film
 Best Documentary Film
 Best Indywood Panorama Movie
 Best Debut Director's Film
 Best Feature Film

ALIIFF 2015—Golden Frame Award Winners

ALIIFF 2016—Golden Frame Award Winners

ALIIFF 2017—Golden Frame Award Winners

ALIIFF 2018—Golden Frame Award Winners

References 

Indian film awards
International Film Festival of India
Short film festivals in India
Documentary film festivals in India
Indian film festivals